Melvin Breeden, professionally known as Mel-Man and Birdman, is an American executive music producer from Norfolk, Virginia. He is the president and CEO of Big Cat Records and Radar Live, which Billboard placed at #13 on their list of Top Rap Labels in 2005. Breeden also marketed and released independent projects from Gucci Mane, Rasheeda and Khia.

Atlanta-based rapper Gucci Mane was upset with Big Cat Records label following the release of his 2009 album Murder Was The Case. However, Breeden and Mane squashed their feud the following year.

Credits

Executive producer
Freak Nasty – Da Dip (1997)
Freak Nasty – Down Low (1998)
Cherrelle – The Right Time (1999)
Buju Banton – Toppa Di Top (2002)
Various Artists – 504 va 404 (2004)
Various Artists – Street Certified (2005)
Rasheeda – GA Peach (2006)
Gucci Mane – Trap House (2005)
MACEO – Straight Out Da Pot (2006)
Gucci Mane – Hard To Kill (2006)
Gucci Mane – Trap-A-Thon (2007)
Gucci Mane – Hood Classics (2008)
Gucci Mane – Bird Money (2009)
Khia – Nasti Muzik (2008)
Gucci Mane – Murder Was The Case (2009)
Canton Jones – Worship Mode (2017)
Canton Jones – GREATNESS (2018)
LAIKA – Sad Girl (2020)
TE-RAYE – Mannequin (2021)

Production credits

 Khia – Nasti Muzik
Gucci Mane – Murder Was The Case

References

External links
 

Living people
American male composers
Songwriters from Virginia
21st-century American composers
Musicians from Norfolk, Virginia
21st-century American male musicians
Year of birth missing (living people)
American male songwriters